John Bannister Gibson (November 8, 1780 – May 3, 1853) was a Pennsylvania attorney, politician in the state legislature, and judge, including years on the Pennsylvania Supreme Court from 1816 to his death in 1853. He served as chief justice on the court for 24 years. In 1821, Gibson was elected as a member of the American Philosophical Society.

Early life
Born in Perry County, Pennsylvania, Gibson was named for John Banister, a Virginia hero of the American Revolution. Gibson's father, George Gibson, also fought in the war and remained in service after its end. George Gibson was killed in an expedition to the Great Black Swamp in northwest Ohio during the Northwest Indian Wars, when Gibson was eleven years old.

In 1795 or 1796, Gibson was sent to Dickinson College in Carlisle, Pennsylvania, where he remained about four years. Apparently Gibson did not take his degree, and the tradition is that he made very little mark as a student, though his latent abilities, or rather, his occasional and spasmodic indications of ability, were recognized by a few. Judge Hugh Brackenridge of the state Supreme Court, who lived in Carlisle, took some notice of the tall and awkward young student, and gave him the use of his library, the best in the town, which Gibson greatly appreciated.

On leaving college, Gibson read law in Carlisle, in the office of Thomas Duncan, a lawyer of sound and thorough, if not brilliant ability, well versed in the learning of the time. In 1803, Gibson was admitted to the bar in Cumberland County, and later in the same year at Pittsburgh. In 1804, he was admitted in Beaver County, and he also practiced for a short time in Hagerstown, Maryland.

In 1809, Gibson was elected on the Democratic tickets to the Pennsylvania state legislature, and again in 1810. As chairman of the judiciary committee, he secured the passage of the Act of 1812, abolishing survivorship as an incident of joint tenancy.

In 1811 he championed the cause of Judge Thomas Cooper against impeachment proceedings. The legislature heard testimony that Cooper "berated lawyers, denigrated witnesses... carried deadly weapons to court,... and decided a case in which he had a financial stake." The legislature voted to remove the judge.

Marriage and family

Gibson was married in 1812 to Sarah Work Galbraith of Carlisle. They had eight children, five of whom survived to adulthood.

Judicial career
In 1813, Governor Simon Snyder appointed Gibson as judge of the new Eleventh judicial district. Gibson took up his residence at Wilkes-Barre, Pennsylvania, where he first held court in a log-house.

Pennsylvania Supreme Court service
On June 27, 1816, he was appointed by Governor Simon Snyder as an associate-justice of the Supreme Court, to fill the place vacated by the death of his friend, Hugh Brackenridge. He joined Chief Justice William Tilghman and Justice Jasper Yeates. Placed, at the age of thirty-six, in so responsible and dignified a position, and brought into close contact with the wide learning and experience of these veteran judges, Gibson quickly realized his deficiencies. He studied laboriously during the first years of his service on the supreme bench, and became engrossed in the law. He acquired a vast and accurate knowledge which gave him, as the years passed, a sureness and mastery, rarely equaled by any judge, in dealing with all questions presented.

In 1817, on the death of Judge Yeates, Thomas Duncan was appointed to the vacancy, largely, it is supposed, through the influence of Gibson. He served with his preceptor on the bench as his junior associate.

A constitutional amendment in 1838 changed the tenure of office of the Supreme Court justices from life to a term of fifteen years. It provided that the commissions of the judges then in office should expire at intervals of three years, in the order of their seniority as of January 1, 1839. Judge Gibson had opposed this change on broad grounds of public policy. At the suggestion of his associates, he resigned and was reappointed by Governor Joseph Ritner in 1838, thus prolonging his term by several years. This action was criticized by the newspapers.

An 1850 state constitutional amendment provided that the judges of the Supreme Court should be elected instead of being appointed by the governor. At the Democratic Party convention in 1851, the only member of the existing court who was placed upon the ticket was Chief Justice Gibson.

"The nomination," says Judge Porter, "was an act of high homage to his character. It was the result of that feeling. He was more than seventy years of age, too old, if he had been willing, to accomplish by his own energy anything to promote his nomination, and as unacquainted as a child with partisan politics and with party leaders. In one sense, the nomination was a rebuke to himself. He had seldom lost an opportunity to express his want of confidence in popular action, and his disapprobation of every movement designed to enlarge the boundaries of popular power. He took as little pains to conceal his sentiments on this point as on all others, and while he expressed them decorously he uttered them boldly. It must, therefore, have cost him some surprise, if not compunction, to find that carrying into effect the very movement of which he had most horror, the people, through their representatives, chose to retain their hold of him as one of their most important public servants."

The judges drew lots for the terms, the law providing that one of them should go out of office every three years. Jeremiah Black drew the shortest term, and with it the office of chief justice. Gibson was commissioned as associate in the court where he had sat as chief justice for twenty-four years.

Soon after his election as justice, Gibson became severely ill. His mind was as sharp as ever, but he was left physically frail. In the spring of 1853, he went to Philadelphia, against the protest of his physicians, to attend the meeting of the court. He died there on May 3, in his room in the United States Hotel, on Chestnut Street between Fifth and Sixth. He was buried at Carlisle, close to the graves of Brackenridge and Duncan.

Sources
This work incorporates material from Samuel Dreher Matlack, "JOHN BANNISTER GIBSON. 1780-1853." in William Draper Lewis, Great American Lawyers (1909), pp. 351–404.

References

External links
"John Bannister Gibson", Encyclopedia Dickensia, Dickinson College
Gibson Ancestors, by descendant Thomas K. Gibson

Justices of the Supreme Court of Pennsylvania
Pennsylvania lawyers
1780 births
1853 deaths
People from Perry County, Pennsylvania
U.S. state supreme court judges admitted to the practice of law by reading law
19th-century American judges
19th-century American lawyers